Fredrik Henge (born 30 December 1974) is a Swedish professional golfer.

Henge was born in Lund and turned professional in 1997. He has earned his place on the top level European Tour several times, the first via qualifying school at the end of 1997 and twice by his position on the Challenge Tour Rankings, but has failed to win enough money on each occasion to retain his card.

Henge has had most of his success on the second tier Challenge Tour, where he has won five tournaments, two in both 1997 and 2000, when he finished seventh on the end of season rankings, and one in 2004.

His best finish on the European Tour was tied 7th at the 2006 Johnnie Walker Championship at Gleneagles, Perthshire, Scotland. He finished 29th at his home tournament in Sweden on the European Tour, the 2011 Nordea Masters at Brof Hof Slott, Stockholm, after being tied 9th after two rounds.

Professional wins (6)

Challenge Tour wins (5)

Challenge Tour playoff record (1–0)

Nordic Golf League wins (1)

Results in major championships

CUT = missed the half-way cut
Note: Henge only played in The Open Championship.

See also
List of golfers with most Challenge Tour wins

References

External links

Fredrik Henge at golfdata.se 

Swedish male golfers
European Tour golfers
Sportspeople from Lund
Sportspeople from Malmö
1974 births
Living people
20th-century Swedish people